Taranis nexilis is a species of sea snail, a marine gastropod mollusk in the family Raphitomidae.

Subspecies
 Taranis nexilis bicarinata (Suter, 1915)
 Taranis nexilis recens (C. A. Fleming, 1948)

Description
The length of the shell attains 2 mm.

(Original description) The minute, fusiform shell is cancellated. It contains six whorls with two polished whorls in the protoconch. The spire-whorls show a prominent spiral keel, crossed by rather oblique and rather distant spiral threads, forming an obtuse angle on the keel. The suture is margined. The body whorl contains 8 or 9 spiral ribs, the first and third larger than the others. The others after the sixth come very close together on the siphonal canal. These are crossed by rather distant longitudinal lines which form a very obtuse angle on the first spiral rib or keel. The aperture is less than half the length of the shell, rather constricted and angled behind. The columella is straight, produced into a short canal.

Distribution
This marine species occurs off New Zealand and the Philippines.

References

 Powell, A.W.B. 1979 New Zealand Mollusca: Marine, Land and Freshwater Shells, Collins, Auckland

External links
 Powell, A. W. B. The family Turridae in the Indo-Pacific. Part 1a. The subfamily Turrinae concluded, Indo-Pacific mollusca. vol. 1, 1964
 

nexilis
Gastropods described in 1885
Gastropods of New Zealand